María Ignacia Benítez (1 August 1958 – 28 February 2019) was the Chilean Minister of the Environment, between 2010 and 2014.

Biography
Benítez was born in Viña del Mar in Chile. She was the oldest of five children. She went to school locally before studying civil engineering at the University of Chile.

She served under General Pinochet before leaving to be a consultant.

In March 2010, she was appointed to be the Minister of the Environment by the President of Chile Sebastián Piñera despite conflicts of interest with her business interests. The previous minister was Ana Lya Uriarte.

In 2012, she had a public row with the Supreme Court who were holding up a contract she was interested in. Accusations of "improper and unacceptable interference" were made against her.

Benítez was married and had three children. She died of pancreatic cancer in February 2019.

References

1958 births
2019 deaths
People from Viña del Mar
Chilean civil engineers
Government ministers of Chile
Women government ministers of Chile
Chilean women engineers
20th-century women engineers
Deaths from cancer in Chile
Deaths from pancreatic cancer
Independent Democratic Union politicians